Abbas Farzanegan (1914–2004) served as Iran's ambassador to Saudi Arabia and four other countries during Mohammad-Rezā Shāh Pahlavi's reign. He served in a variety of roles, including governor of the state of Esfahan, communications minister, and general. He was part of the plot to overthrow Mohammed Mosaddeq and install Mohammad Reza Pahlavi to power. He lived in the United States since 1975.

Farzanegan died on March 17, 2004, at the age of 94.

References 

1910s births
Year of birth uncertain
2004 deaths
Governors of Isfahan
Imperial Iranian Army brigadier generals
Ambassadors of Iran to Saudi Arabia
Iranian emigrants to the United States